

Hans de Salengre-Drabbe (21 October 1894 – 25 August 1944) was a general in the Wehrmacht of Nazi Germany during World War II who commanded the 384th Infantry Division.  He was a recipient of the Knight's Cross of the Iron Cross.  Salengre-Drabbe was killed on 25 August 1944 in Tiraspol, Moldova in the course of the Soviet Jassy–Kishinev Offensive.

Awards and decorations

 Knight's Cross of the Iron Cross on 22 February 1942 as Oberst and commander of Infanterie-Regiment 457

References

Citations

Bibliography

 

1894 births
1944 deaths
People from Sigmaringen
People from the Province of Hohenzollern
German Army personnel of World War I
Prussian Army personnel
German Army personnel killed in World War II
Recipients of the clasp to the Iron Cross, 1st class
Recipients of the Gold German Cross
Recipients of the Knight's Cross of the Iron Cross
Reichswehr personnel
Military personnel from Baden-Württemberg
German Army generals of World War II